João Filipe Iria Santos Moutinho  (born 8 September 1986) is a Portuguese footballer who plays as a central midfielder for Premier League club Wolverhampton Wanderers and the Portugal national team.

Moutinho began his professional career with Sporting CP, moving in 2010 to FC Porto and winning twelve major titles between the two clubs combined. Three years later he transferred to Monaco for €25 million, conquering the Ligue 1 championship in the 2016–17 season; in 2018, he joined Wolverhampton Wanderers.

Moutinho represented the Portugal national team at four European Championships, one UEFA Nations League finals and two FIFA World Cups, winning the 2016 and 2019 editions of each of the former two tournaments.

Club career

Sporting
Moutinho was born in Barreiro, Setúbal District, but his birth was registered in Portimão, Algarve, where he grew up. After showing great promise as a boy playing for Portimonense SC, he signed with Sporting Clube de Portugal from Lisbon when he turned 13 to continue his football education.

During the 2004–05 pre-season, at only 17 years of age, Moutinho was called by manager José Peseiro to the main squad. However, he then returned to the junior team coached by Paulo Bento and featured alongside such players such as Miguel Veloso and Nani, helping the side win the national title that season.

In the beginning of 2005, Moutinho was called up for a Taça de Portugal match, eventually playing 20 minutes against F.C. Pampilhosa, and made his Primeira Liga debut on 23 January, staying in the entire 3–0 win at Gil Vicente F.C. and wearing the #28 shirt previously worn by Cristiano Ronaldo. Based on consistent displays, he wasted no time in establishing himself as a regular while being able to play in any position across a flat midfield or in a diamond formation; his box-to-box dynamism and determination quickly made him a firm fan favourite, as he rarely missed a game since becoming first-choice.

Moutinho's performances in the closing stages of the campaign, especially in the UEFA Cup with player of the match displays against Feyenoord and Newcastle United that helped the Lions reach the final of the competition, made him an automatic starter despite his young age; he contributed with 15 league games as his team finished second and, during the summer, he agreed to a one-year extension.

In his first full season, Moutinho's further progress and exceptional consistency (he was the only player to play every minute of every match in the domestic league) was one of the brightest spots in Sporting's runner-up final place. Incidentally, he scored his team's final goal of the campaign, a 1–0 win over S.C. Braga to ensure a return to UEFA Champions League football for the Lisbon side.

In 2006–07, following the departure of veteran Ricardo Sá Pinto, Moutinho was made vice-captain at just 19 years of age. The following season, after Custódio and Ricardo also left, he would be named captain, the second youngest in the history of the club's professional football, behind first captain and associate founder Francisco Stromp.

In 2008–09, after an aborted deal with Premier League club Everton, Moutinho was again ever present, only missing three league matches (43 overall appearances) as Sporting finished once again runners-up; he also had the dubious distinction of netting his side's only goal in the Champions League round of 16 clash against FC Bayern Munich, a 1–12 aggregate loss.

Porto

On 3 July 2010, Moutinho signed a five-year contract with rivals FC Porto, with the transfer price reaching €11 million (€1 million being paid for 50% of the rights to central defender Nuno André Coelho); additionally, Sporting would receive 25% of any added value (Portuguese: mais valia) occurring during that time frame, provided it surpassed the previous value. Sporting Chairman José Eduardo Bettencourt described Moutinho's conduct as deplorable and called him a "rotten apple", adding: "The deal was done because Sporting wanted it, because it did not want a rotten apple in its orchard, and it did not want someone who was not an example, nor dignified the flag of the club." Soon after, Porto sold 37.5% of the player's economic rights to a third party, Mamers BV, for €4,125,000.

Moutinho was an ever-present figure for Porto in his first season. He appeared in 50 official games as the northerners won the league and, even though he did not score in league competition, he netted twice in the campaign's Portuguese Cup, most notably in a 3–1 away win against S.L. Benfica, with his team overcoming the 0–2 home loss in the first leg to reach the final, in which the player also appeared, against Vitória de Guimarães (6–2); he added another 90 minutes in the final of the Europa League, and the club won the treble.

On 3 August 2011, Porto partnered with Soccer Invest Fund to buy back 37.5% of Moutinho's economic rights. The private investment fund acquired 15% after the overall transactions, while Porto recouped 22.5% for €4 million; the residual 15% was acquired by Porto in 2013, for €3.3 million.

On 19 February 2013, Moutinho scored to help his team to a 1–0 home win over Málaga CF for the Champions League round of 16, netting from close range after an Alex Sandro cross (eventual 2–1 aggregate loss). He made 43 appearances during the campaign all competitions comprised (five goals, 3,515 minutes of action), as both team and player won their third consecutive league championship.

Monaco
On 24 May 2013, it was announced that Moutinho had joined AS Monaco FC alongside teammate James Rodríguez for a combined fee believed to be around €70 million (€25 million for Moutinho). He made his official debut for his new club on 1 September, starting and setting up both goals in a 2–1 win at Olympique de Marseille which put them top of Ligue 1.

Moutinho was first-choice in his debut campaign, as the principality team finished runners-up straight out of Ligue 2. His only goal was an equaliser in a 1–1 away draw to Stade de Reims, on 29 September.

On 16 September 2014, in Monaco's first Champions League match since 2005, Moutinho scored the only goal in a home defeat of Bayer 04 Leverkusen. He finished the season with 52 overall appearances, in an eventual third-place finish for the Leonardo Jardim-led side.

Moutinho contributed with two goals from 31 matches during 2016–17, helping the club to the eighth national championship of its history.

Wolverhampton Wanderers
On 24 July 2018, Moutinho joined newly-promoted English club Wolverhampton Wanderers on a two-year-deal for an undisclosed fee, reported to be around £5 million. He made his Premier League debut on 11 August, featuring 85 minutes in a 2–2 home draw against Everton. His first goal in the competition arrived on 22 September, when he scored from just outside the box with his weaker left foot in a 1–1 draw away to Manchester United.

Wolverhampton fans voted Moutinho as Player of the Season at the conclusion of his first campaign. He played all thirty-eight league fixtures in the process, adding six appearances in their run to the semi-final in the FA Cup, the first since 1997–98.

On 23 November 2019, shortly after Moutinho had scored his team's opening goal in a 2–1 league win away to AFC Bournemouth, his second in the competition, it was announced that he had signed a new contract with the club keeping him at Molineux until 2022. On 12 December the following year, he was sent off for a second yellow card in a 0–1 home loss to West Midlands neighbours Aston Villa; it was his first red card in 859 career matches. He scored his first goal at Molineux, and the third of his Wolves career, from 30 yards against Arsenal in a 2–1 win on 2 February 2021, as his team did the double over the North London side in that season for the first time since 1978–79.

Moutinho scored the only goal in a win over Manchester United on 3 January 2022, sealing Wolves' first league victory at Old Trafford since 1980. In the next away game 19 days later, he scored again in a 2–1 win over Brentford to score more than once in a season for the first time in his Wolves career. Although his contract expired that 1 July, he signed a new one-year deal three days later.

International career

A full Portugal international at the age of 18, Moutinho made his debut on 17 August 2005 in a 2–0 home friendly win against Egypt in Ponta Delgada. Ever since the 2006 FIFA World Cup, he became a regular call-up.

On 31 May 2008, Moutinho registered his first goal for the national team in a 2–0 friendly victory over Georgia at Estádio do Fontelo in Viseu. He was picked for the squad-of-23 for UEFA Euro 2008 and, in the opening game, assisted on a goal by Raul Meireles in a 2–0 victory over Turkey.

Moutinho also played in two UEFA European Under-21 Championships, scoring against Germany in the 2006 edition, played on home soil, as the Portuguese exited in the group stage on both occasions; additionally, although not part of the provisional 24-player list for the 2010 World Cup in South Africa, he was named in a backup list of six players.

Moutinho played all the games and minutes at the Euro 2012 tournament. In the semi-finals against Spain, he missed his penalty shootout attempt in an eventual 2–4 loss (0–0 after 120 minutes).

Moutinho was selected by former Sporting boss Bento for the 2014 World Cup, making his debut in the tournament on 16 June in a 0–4 group stage defeat to Germany. On 8 October 2015, he scored the only goal as Portugal defeated Denmark at the Estádio Municipal de Braga to seal qualification for Euro 2016, and three days later was also on the scoresheet in a 2–1 win away to Serbia which confirmed his team's position as group winners.

After six appearances out of a possible seven to help his nation win the European Championships for the first time ever, Moutinho was also picked for the 2017 FIFA Confederations Cup squad by Fernando Santos. In the latter competition, in the final group stage game in Saint Petersburg, he won his 100th cap by playing the full 90 minutes in the 4–0 defeat of New Zealand.

Moutinho was included in the 2018 World Cup squad. On 2 June, in a pre-tournament goalless friendly draw away to Belgium, he captained the side for the first time.

On 14 November 2020, in a home defeat to France, Moutinho gained his 128th cap, surpassing Luís Figo to become the second most capped Portuguese player of all time, only behind teammate and captain Cristiano Ronaldo.

Moutinho was named in Portugal's final squad for the delayed UEFA Euro 2020 tournament.

In October 2022, he was named in Portugal's preliminary 55-man squad for the 2022 FIFA World Cup in Qatar. However, he did not make the final cut.

Personal life
Moutinho's father, Nélson, was also a footballer. A forward, he played for several clubs during a 15-year senior career. Moutinho's cousin, Hugo, also plays the sport professionally.

Alongside his native Portuguese, Moutinho also speaks English and French, being proficient in the former already upon arrival in England.

Career statistics

Club

International
Appearances by national team and year

Honours

Sporting CP
Taça de Portugal: 2006–07, 2007–08
Supertaça Cândido de Oliveira: 2007, 2008
UEFA Cup runner-up: 2004–05
Taça da Liga runner-up: 2007–08, 2008–09

Porto
Primeira Liga: 2010–11, 2011–12, 2012–13
Taça de Portugal: 2010–11
Supertaça Cândido de Oliveira: 2010, 2011, 2012
UEFA Europa League: 2010–11
Taça da Liga runner-up: 2012–13
UEFA Super Cup runner-up: 2011

Monaco
Ligue 1: 2016–17
Coupe de la Ligue runner-up: 2016–17, 2017–18
Portugal
UEFA European Championship: 2016
UEFA Nations League: 2018–19
FIFA Confederations Cup third place: 2017
UEFA European Under-17 Championship: 2003
Individual
SJPF Player of the Month: April 2005
SJPF Young Player of the Month: October 2006, November 2006, October 2007, November 2007, February 2008, March 2008
Porto Player of the Year: 2012–13
Wolverhampton Wanderers' Player of the Season 2018–19

Orders
 Commander of the Order of Merit

See also 
 List of men's footballers with 100 or more international caps
 List of men's footballers with the most official appearances

References

External links

Profile at the Wolverhampton Wanderers F.C. website

1986 births
Living people
People from Portimão
Sportspeople from Barreiro, Portugal
Portuguese footballers
Association football midfielders
Primeira Liga players
Segunda Divisão players
Sporting CP B players
Sporting CP footballers
FC Porto players
Ligue 1 players
AS Monaco FC players
Premier League players
Wolverhampton Wanderers F.C. players
UEFA Europa League winning players
Portugal youth international footballers
Portugal under-21 international footballers
Portugal international footballers
UEFA Euro 2008 players
UEFA Euro 2012 players
2014 FIFA World Cup players
UEFA Euro 2016 players
2017 FIFA Confederations Cup players
2018 FIFA World Cup players
UEFA Euro 2020 players
UEFA European Championship-winning players
UEFA Nations League-winning players
Portuguese expatriate footballers
Expatriate footballers in Monaco
Expatriate footballers in England
Portuguese expatriate sportspeople in Monaco
Portuguese expatriate sportspeople in England
FIFA Century Club
Commanders of the Order of Merit (Portugal)
Portugal B international footballers